Toorak is a suburb of Melbourne, Victoria, Australia,  south-east of Melbourne's Central Business District, located within the City of Stonnington local government area, on Boonwurrung Land. Toorak recorded a population of 12,817 at the 2021 census.

The name Toorak has become synonymous with wealth and privilege, the suburb long having the reputation of being Melbourne's most elite, and ranking among the most prestigious in Australia. It has the highest average property values in Melbourne, and is one of the most expensive suburbs in Australia. It is the nation's second highest earning postcode after Point Piper in Sydney.

Located on a rise on the south side (or left bank) of a bend in the Yarra River, Toorak is bordered by South Yarra, at Williams Road on the west, Malvern, at Glenferrie Road on the east, Prahran and Armadale, at Malvern Road to the south and the suburbs of Richmond, Burnley and Hawthorn on the north side of the river. The suburb's main street is considered to be Toorak Road, on which the commercial area of Toorak Village is located.

Toorak is named after Toorak House, the 1849-built residence of James Jackson, a merchant.

The suburb has also been a preferred location for many consulate offices and their residences, including China, Britain, Monaco, Sweden, Turkey, and Switzerland.

History

Toponymy
Toorak was named after Toorak House, an Italianate residence built by James Jackson, a merchant, in 1849. The name of the house may have originated from Woiwurrung language, with words of similar pronunciation meaning black crow or reedy swamp.

Toorak House

From 1854 Toorak House served as the residence of the first Governor of Victoria, Captain Sir Charles Hotham KCB RN and his successors, until the completion of the present Government House (1876) in the Kings Domain.

Toorak Post Office opened around June 1858.

1880s land boom

During the land boom of the 1880s, many large and elaborate mansions were erected in Toorak, often in the Italianate style. Following East Melbourne and then St Kilda, Toorak, along with Brighton, became the new favored location for the wealthy.

1890s depression
The suburb was hit particularly hard by the 1890s economic depression and many wealthy landowners declared bankruptcy and were forced to sell. Nonetheless, the suburb remained and is still Melbourne's home of "old money". During the Interwar period, many houses were built in the Tudor revival style; many houses were also designed by society Architect Marcus Martin in the Moderne style over a Georgian building form.

Post-war era
In the period of post-World War II prosperity, rising standards of living and land values caused Toorak to become highly sought after by a new generation of the wealthy, thought by some to be social climbers and nouveau riche. For some of these people, the focus was simply to have the postcode of Toorak, which was SE 2 and now 3142. As a result, many of the larger mansions were demolished and large holdings were subdivided to make way for flats, townhouses and apartments.

In the 1980s, larger houses in Neo-Georgian and Neo-Classical styles began to appear.

Contemporary Toorak
While large mansions have survived in neighbouring Hawthorn, Kew and Armadale, only a few of the original 19th-century mansions in Toorak remain, due in part to the high land value. Two of the most notable are Illawarra House, which was acquired by the National Trust; and Coonac, the most expensive house in Melbourne. In Toorak, some of the old property names live on as street names or the names of blocks of flats, carved out of or built on their sites; Dunraven Avenue, Millicent Avenue, Iona Avenue, Woorigoleen Road, Myoora Road, and Scotsburn Grove are examples.

Demographics

In the 2016 census, there were 12,909 people in Toorak.
 63.9% of people were born in Australia. The next most common countries of birth were China (excludes SARs and Taiwan) 3.6%, England 3.1%, New Zealand 2.2%, India 1.8% and Malaysia 1.2%.
 73.7% of people spoke only English at home. Other languages spoken at home included Mandarin 4.5%, Cantonese 1.8%, Italian 1.4%, Greek 1.3% and French 0.9%.
 The most common responses for religion were no religion 30.9%, Catholic 17.6% and Anglican 14.9%,
 Of the employed people in Toorak, 4.0% worked in legal services. Other major industries of employment included hospitals 3.7%, real estate services 3.1%, general practice medical services 2.9% and clothing retailing 2.7%.
 The proportion of Toorak residents with a Bachelor's degree or higher is 46.7%.

Housing

Toorak has an unusual mix of high-, low- and medium-density housing, due to intense subdivision of larger lots in the 1880s, 1920s and 1960s. The predominant housing in Toorak (49.6%) is apartments, particularly walk-up flats.

Single-family detached homes are also prevalent (30.2%). Some of these homes are in the form of traditional mansions or newer large residences on significant-sized estates, owned by Melbourne's wealthy and social elite. The architectural style of the mansions is predominantly Italianate and colonial. 
There are also extant stands of semi-detached housing (20.1%), including terraces, which were traditionally fashionable with the middle class and later gentrified.

Politics

Toorak falls within the federal electorate of Higgins. The seat of Higgins was created in 1949 and held by Harold Holt CH 1949–1967, Sir John Gorton PC GCMG AC CH 1968–1975, Roger Shipton OAM 1975–1990, Peter Costello AC 1990–2009, Kelly O'Dwyer 2009-2019 and Katie Allen 2019-2022 (all on behalf of the Liberal Party of Australia). However, the seat would fall to the Labor Party for the first time ever in the 2022 Federal Election, with candidate Michelle Ananda-Rajah winning the seat as Labor took government from the coalition.

At State level, it mostly falls within the electorate of Malvern (currently held by the Liberals' Michael O'Brien) since the 2006 Victorian State Election, with the western part of the suburb falling within the electorate of Prahran (currently held by Sam Hibbins on behalf the Australian Greens). At local council level, Toorak falls within the City of Stonnington.

Toorak has historically voted for conservative political parties. The Liberal Party retained the seat of Malvern in the 2018 State Election, although there was a 10.1% swing to the Australian Labor Party.

Toorak Village

The Toorak Village is a strip of shops and cafes, located centrally in Toorak Road.

Places of worship
 Saint John's Anglican Church, an 1862 Gothic Revival bluestone church, designed by William Wardell, dominates the skyline of Toorak, with a large tower including a peal of bells and a distinctive sandstone broach spire. The church was formally established at a meeting held on 21st November 1859. Those present were Messrs Alfred Ross, H.W. Dauglish, J Goodman, Allan Spowers, John Steavenson, Jas Blackwood, J Quarterman, W.M. Hammill, H.W. Farrar, George Hull, Captain Sawell, W.T. Wood, P Gunning, E Davis, J Slater, G Guillaume and son. Construction began in April 1860, and was completed on 23rd October 1860. The ground for the church buildings was selected by Bishop Parry at what was the entrance to the Orrong Estate, which was the property of Mr Alfred Ross. The foundation stone was laid by the Governor, Sir Henry Barkly.  Saint John's, Toorak is one of the most popular wedding venue churches in Australia. 

 Saint Peter's Roman Catholic Church, built in 1876 in the Gothic style and extended in 1934. A campanile was added during renovations in 2018. 

 Toorak Uniting Church (1876), in the Frenchified Gothic style

 Swedish Church

The Wesleyan Church (1877), formerly on the corner of Toorak and Williams Roads, was illegally demolished in 1990 by developers and later replaced by a block of flats.

Schools

Schools in Toorak include St Catherine's School, Loreto Mandeville Hall, St Kevin's College, Glamorgan (now Toorak Campus, the junior school of Geelong Grammar School) and Toorak Central School (1890).

Sport

The Royal South Yarra Lawn Tennis Club was founded in 1884 and is located in Toorak. Kooyong Stadium, former home of the Australian Open, is located on Glenferrie Road.

Transport 

The most popular form of transport in Toorak is the automobile. CityLink runs along north eastern Toorak, though there are no interchanges within the suburb, although there is access to the freeway via MacRobertson Bridge and interchanges at Burnley. Main arterials running north–south are Williams Road (at the eastern boundary), Grange Road, Orrong Road, St Georges Road and Kooyong Road. The east–west arterials include Alexandra Avenue (at the northern boundary), Toorak Road (which runs midway through the suburb) and Malvern Road (at the southern boundary). Alexandra Avenue becomes St Georges Road and both along with Grange Road feed onto the MacRobertson Bridge, Toorak's main river crossing.

Toorak's road planning is an example of street hierarchy. As a result, there are numerous quiet pedestrian streets. However, traffic congestion is an increasing problem along Toorak Road and Williams Roads. There is limited street parking along the main roads with just a couple of multi-storey car parks and parking lots within proximity of the main Toorak Road shopping strip. There are no level crossings in Toorak. There is a perception in popular culture of the luxury 4WD as a status symbol, (controversial for their comfort rather than for their off-road abilities) and this has been associated with the suburb of Toorak, such that in popular Australian culture, the term 'Toorak Tractor' has become well established in Australian slang. An example of this was an episode of the popular program Top Gear Australia, aired on SBS TV, in which the presenters, tongue-in-cheek, drove a $200,000 tractor along Toorak Road.

Toorak's only railway station is Heyington, on the Glen Waverley line, which crosses the Yarra from Richmond on the Heyington Railway Bridge, to the suburb's north. Despite its name, Toorak railway station is located in Armadale. The Pakenham, Frankston and Cranbourne railway line group to which this station belongs runs close to Toorak's southern boundary. Other nearby stations include Hawksburn, in South Yarra and Kooyong, in Kooyong.

Trams have run down Toorak Road since 1888. Route 58 runs along Toorak Road to Glenferrie Road, at the suburb's eastern boundary. Route 72 runs along Malvern Road, the suburb's southern boundary.

Cycling facilities are poor, with few marked on road lanes. MacRobertson Bridge and Gardiners Creek pedestrian bridge, however, the bridge provides pedestrians access to the Main Yarra Trail and shared bicycle and pedestrian paths in nearby Burnley. Pedestrians are serviced by an extensive network of footpaths and pedestrian crossings.

Residents

Celebrities, philanthropists, cultural figures
 Tina Arena AM – singer/songwriter
 Dame Zara Bate DBE – Fashion designer and wife of Harold Holt
 Martin Clemens CBE MC AM - war hero 
 Albert Dadon AM – Chair of the Australian Israel Cultural Exchange
 Gina Liano – Real Housewife of Melbourne
 Paul Little AO and Jane Hansen – business people, philanthropists, Little was a former president of the Essendon Football Club
 Peter Hudson – television chef and entertainer, born in Toorak in 1930
 Eddie McGuire AM – Journalist, sports commentator, television and radio personality, Australian republic advocate and former president of the Collingwood Football Club
 Dame Elisabeth Murdoch AC DBE
 Dame Merlyn Myer DBE – philanthropist
 Sir Norman Myer – philanthropist and chairman of the Myer Emporium
 Sidney Myer – philanthropist and founder of the Myer Emporium
 Livinia Nixon – Channel 9 presenter and the Ambassador and face for the City of Melbourne-Grew up in Toorak
 Daniel Radcliffe – his family owns a house in Toorak
 Lady Susan Renouf – socialite
 Peter Robb – Australian author, born in Toorak in 1946
 Dame Hilda Stevenson DBE – philanthropist

Politicians
 Ted Baillieu – Victorian Liberal Party politician, 46th Premier of Victoria
 Malcolm Fraser AC CH – Liberal Party politician, 22nd Prime Minister of Australia
 Duncan Gillies – Colonial politician, 14th Premier of Victoria
 David Hamer AM DSC - Director of Naval Intelligence, Liberal Party Senator
 Sir Rupert Hamer AC KCMG ED - Liberal Party politician, 39th Premier of Victoria
 Harold Holt CH - Liberal Party politician, 17th Prime Minister of Australia
 Sir William Murray McPherson KBE - Philanthropist and politician, 31st Premier of Victoria

Businesspeople
 John Munro Bruce - retail businessman, father of prime minister Stanley Bruce
 Lindsay Fox AC - Former Australian Rules footballer, owner of the Linfox transportation company
 Michael Gudinski AM - Entrepreneur and businessman
 Solomon Lew – Importer and retail supplier, current resident of Toorak
 Peter Lew – managing director of Witchery clothing, son of Solomon Lew
 Keith Murdoch - journalist and newspaper owner
 Ziggy Switkowski AO – former CEO of Telstra
 Sir Donald Trescowthick AC KBE
 Alex Waislitz - Chairman & CEO of Thorney Investment group, vice president of the Collingwood Football Club
 Ron Walker AC —CBE – Lord Mayor of Melbourne

Sportspeople
 Nathan Buckley – Australian rules footballer and current head coach of the Collingwood Football Club
 Andrew Demetriou – Former Chief Executive of the AFL
 Walter Fellows – English-born vicar who hit a cricket ball for 175 yards, considered the world record
 Lleyton Hewitt – Australian tennis player
 Clem Hill – Australian test cricketer
 James Hird – Australian Rules Footballer and former Head Coach of the Essendon Football Club
 Ed Langdon- AFL footballer- grew up in Toorak
 Tom Langdon- AFL footballer- grew up in Toorak
 Charlie McLeod – Australian test cricketer
 Lou Richards MBE – Australian Rules footballer
 Jack Saunders – Australian test cricketer
 Tup Scott – cricketer

See also
 City of Malvern – Parts of Toorak were previously within this former local government area.
 City of Prahran – Parts of Toorak were previously within this former local government area.

References

Suburbs of Melbourne
Suburbs of the City of Stonnington